The 2016 Utah Utes women's soccer team represented the University of Utah during the 2016 NCAA Division I women's soccer season.

Schedule

References

Utah Utes women's soccer